NGC 394 is a lenticular galaxy located in the constellation Pisces. It was discovered on October 26, 1854 by R. J. Mitchell. It was described by Dreyer as "faint, small, 50 arcsec northeast of II 218.", with II 218 being NGC 392.

References

External links
 

0394
Lenticular galaxies
18541026
Pisces (constellation)
004049